Spring Lake is a lake in Dakota County, in the U.S. state of Minnesota.

Spring Lake was named from the fact there are many springs near it.

See also
List of lakes in Minnesota

References

Lakes of Minnesota
Lakes of Dakota County, Minnesota